Dame Linda Jane Holloway  (née Brown, born 10 June 1940) is a Scottish-born New Zealand anatomical pathologist academic, and was a full professor at the University of Otago.

Early life
Holloway was born in Loanhead, Midlothian, Scotland, on 10 June 1940. She was raised in that country, and met her husband, New Zealand forester John Stevenson Holloway, the son of John Thorpe Holloway, while he was a student at the University of Aberdeen. She moved to New Zealand in 1970, becoming a naturalised New Zealander in 1978.

Academic career
After emigrating, Holloway initially worked in provincial New Zealand, before moving to the University of Otago and Dunedin Hospital in 1975. She held numerous administrative and advisory roles, including medical advisor to the Cartwright Inquiry and being a long-serving member of the Abortion Supervisory Committee. Holloway became a full professor at Otago in 1994, and following her retirement in 2006 was conferred the title of professor emeritus.

In the 1997 Queen's Birthday Honours, Holloway was appointed an Officer of the New Zealand Order of Merit, for services to medicine. She was elevated to Distinguished Companion of the New Zealand Order of Merit in the 2005 Queen’s Birthday Honours, and she accepted redesignation as a Dame Companion of the New Zealand Order of Merit following the restoration of titular honours by the New Zealand government in 2009.

Personal life
Holloway's husband, John, was appointed a Member of the New Zealand Order of Merit, for services to forestry and conservation, in the 1998 Queen's Birthday Honours. He died in Dunedin on 1 January 1999.

Selected works 
 Linda Jane Holloway, Like leaves from a tree : common pathways to life and death, 1996 
 Davis, Ben W., Richard D. Gelber, Aron Goldhirsch, William H. Hartmann, Gottfried W. Locher, Richard Reed, R. Golouh et al. "Prognostic significance of tumor grade in clinical trials of adjuvant therapy for breast cancer with axillary lymph node metastasis." Cancer 58, no. 12 (1986): 2662–2670.

References

Living people
1940 births
New Zealand women academics
Academic staff of the University of Otago
Women anatomists
New Zealand anatomists
Women pathologists
New Zealand pathologists
Scottish emigrants to New Zealand
Dames Companion of the New Zealand Order of Merit
Naturalised citizens of New Zealand
Alumni of the University of Aberdeen